Sarah Anne Fillier (born June 9, 2000) is a Canadian ice hockey player. She made her debut for the Canada women's national ice hockey team at the 2018 4 Nations Cup, where the team gained a silver medal.

Playing career

College
During the 2018–19 season, Filler led Princeton in scoring with 22 goals and 35 assists in 29 games. Her assists per game and points per game led the entire NCAA, as did her 21 power play points. Following the season she was named the Women's Hockey Commissioners Association National Rookie of the Year.

PWHL
With the Oakville Jr. Hornets of Ontario's Provincial Women's Hockey League, Fillier played for a team that was consistently one of the top teams in the PWHL. During the 2015-16 season, Fillier captured a silver medal with the Hornets at the OWHA Provincial Championships.

Fillier would enjoy a landmark season in 2016-17. In addition, to ranking second on the team in scoring, she would capture a PWHL championship along with a gold medal at the OWHA Provincial Championships (Intermediate AA level).

Bestowed the Jr. Hornets captaincy for the 2017-18 season, Fillier tied for eights in the PWHL in goals scored while pacing all scorers during the 2018 PWHL playoffs. She would enjoy a podium finish at the OWHA Provincial Championships for the third consecutive season, obtaining a silver. She would also lead the Jr. Hornets to a silver medal in the PWHL Championships.

International
In May 2021, she was one of 28 players invited to Hockey Canada's Centralization Camp, which represents the selection process for the Canadian women's team that shall compete in Ice hockey at the 2022 Winter Olympics. On January 11, 2022, Fillier was named to Canada's 2022 Olympic team. The team won the gold medal, defeating the United States in the final 3-2.

Career statistics

Regular season and playoffs

International

Awards and honours
Most Valuable Player, 2017 Canadian National Under-18 Championships
 ECAC Rookie of the year 2018-19
 National Rookie of the Year 2018-19
 Ivy League Rookie and Player of the year 2018-19
2019-20 CCM Hockey Women's Division I All-American: Second Team
2022 Beijing Olympics Women's Gold Medal

References

2000 births
Canadian women's ice hockey forwards
Ice hockey people from Ontario
Living people
Princeton Tigers women's ice hockey players
Ice hockey players at the 2022 Winter Olympics
Medalists at the 2022 Winter Olympics
Olympic gold medalists for Canada
Olympic medalists in ice hockey
Olympic ice hockey players of Canada
Canadian expatriate ice hockey players in the United States